Eupithecia natalica is a moth in the family Geometridae. It is found in South America.

References

Moths described in 1994
natalica
Moths of South America